SS El Sol was a cargo ship built in 1910 for the Morgan Line, a subsidiary of the Southern Pacific Company. During World War I, she was known as USAT El Sol in service with the United States Army and as USS El Sol (ID-4505) in service with the United States Navy. At the end of war, she reverted to her original name of SS El Sol.

SS El Sol was one of four sister ships that carried cargo and a limited number of passengers for the Morgan Line. She was acquired by the U.S. Army after the United States entered World War I in April 1917, and converted to carry horses and mules to France. In August 1918, the ship was transferred to the U.S. Navy and continued transporting animals through the end of the war.

El Sol returned to the Morgan Line in 1919 and sailed with them until March 1927, when she sank in New York Harbor after colliding with Sac City of the American Diamond Lines. A portion of the ship's cargo was salvaged but the ship was scrapped later in the year.

Early career 
SS El Sol was a cargo and passenger steamship launched on 11 May 1910 by the Newport News Shipbuilding and Dry Dock Co. of Newport News, Virginia (yard no. 130), and delivered to the Atlantic division of the Morgan Line on 20 August 1910. The vessel sailed for the Morgan Line, the brand name of the Southern Pacific Steamship Company (a subsidiary of the Southern Pacific Railroad), which employed her to carry cargo and a limited number of passengers between New York; New Orleans, the eastern terminus of the Southern Pacific line; and Galveston, Texas.

World War I 
After the United States declared war on Germany in April 1917, El Sol was requisitioned by the United States Shipping Board (USSB) on behalf of the United States Army, who designated her as an animal transport ship. Although there is no information about the specific conversion of El Sol, for other ships this typically meant that any second- or third-class passenger accommodations had to be ripped out and replaced with ramps and stalls for the horses and mules carried.

Sources do not reveal all of El Sol's movements, but it is known that she departed on her second trip to France from Newport News on 10 February 1918. The convoy was escorted by  when it departed from New York on 18 February, and arrived at Saint-Nazaire on 4 March. Ten animals on board El Sol died or were destroyed during the crossing.

The next recorded activity of El Sol was on 3 August, when she was transferred from the Army to the U.S. Navy and commissioned the same day. El Sol was assigned to the Naval Overseas Transportation Service (NOTS) and continued to carry animals and supplies for the U.S. Army.

By August, each animal transport ship had a transport veterinarian and a permanent veterinary detachment to care for the animals while on board the ship. She next departed Newport News on 23 August 1918 with 520 horses and mules on board. Upon arrival at Saint-Nazaire on 19 September, El Sol delivered her complete load of animals; none had died during the passage. After returning to the U.S., El Sol departed again on 30 October with another 620 animals on board. Docking in Bordeaux on 13 November—two days after the Armistice—she again delivered her full load of animals.

El Sol made two more roundtrips for the NOTS over the next five months. During the day on 28 March, Scranton attempted to run a towline to El Sol by sending a launch in the rolling seas, but it capsized, killing three men. Ultimately, El Sol stood by Scranton for over 40 hours until minesweeper  arrived and took Scranton under tow.

At the conclusion of her last NOTS voyage on 3 April, El Sol was converted to a troop transport and assigned to the Navy's Cruiser and Transport Force on 15 April. El Sol returned 2,714 healthy and wounded American servicemen from France in two voyages. Decommissioned on 18 September, El Sol was returned to the Morgan Line soon after.

Postwar civilian service 
El Sol resumed cargo service with the Morgan Line, where she had eight years of uneventful operation. On 11 March 1927, however, El Sol was inbound to New York with a $1,000,000 cargo of pig iron, copper, and bales of cotton. When a heavy fog settled over New York Harbor, Captain Charles H. Knowles ordered his ship to anchor until the fog cleared. As El Sol was being maneuvered into position at about 07:45, the American Diamond Line ship Sac City hit a glancing blow to El Sol, bounced off and then struck El Sol a second time, ripping through El Sol's plating. Out of El Sol's crew of 45 men, 44 were rescued; the ship's carpenter, who could not swim, was last seen clutching the ship's rail as it went below the surface.

El Sol settled on the bottom at a 45° angle with only the tops of her masts protruding above the surface; the Morgan Line house flag—a blue house flag with a red M inside a white star—still fluttered in the breeze. Even though the sunken vessel was not considered a hazard to navigation, in another fog two days later a Staten Island Ferryboat nearly hit El Sol's wreck.

In a hearings before the United States Steamboat Inspection Service, Captain Knowles of El Sol and the captain of Sac City were both cleared of wrongdoing in the collision, and the blame was laid on the heavy fog. On 31 July, The New York Times reported on the cargo salvage operations still underway on the wreck of El Sol. In three months of continuous operations, the salvage company reported that about 35% of the sunken ship's cargo had been recovered. The hulk of El Sol was scrapped later in 1927.

Notes

References

Bibliography

External links 
 

Ocean liners
World War I passenger ships of the United States
World War I auxiliary ships of the United States
Transport ships of the United States Army
Maritime incidents in 1927
Shipwrecks of the New York (state) coast
1910 ships
Cargo ships of the United States Navy
Ships sunk in collisions
Ships built in Newport News, Virginia